The 2007 Zamfara State gubernatorial election occurred on April 14, 2007. ANPP candidate Mahmud Shinkafi won the election, defeating PDP Yahaya Abdulkarim and other candidates.

Results
Mahmud Shinkafi from the ANPP won the election. He defeated Yahaya Abdulkarim of the PDP and others.

The total number of registered voters in the state was 1,330,572.

Mahmud Shinkafi, (ANPP)- 415,455

Yahaya Abdulkarim, PDP- 218,302

Lawali Shuaibu, DPP- 73,625

References 

Zamfara State gubernatorial election
Zamfara State gubernatorial election

2007